George Hall (1912–1989) was an English professional footballer who played over 60 games in the Football League for the likes of Sheffield United and Newport County.

Hall managed Dutch side Sparta Rotterdam between 1948 and 1949.

References

1912 births
English footballers
Kiveton Park F.C. players
Sheffield United F.C. players
English Football League players
Year of death missing
Association football wing halves
English football managers
Sparta Rotterdam managers
English expatriate football managers
English expatriate sportspeople in the Netherlands
Expatriate football managers in the Netherlands